Laure was an art model in France known for her work with artist Édouard Manet. She is best known for posing as the black maid offering the white nude figure a bouquet of flowers in Manet's 1863 painting Olympia.

Biography 
Little is known about Laure.  She has been described as African or Caribbean, her last name is unknown. Art historian Griselda Pollock suggested that she met the artist Édouard Manet while working as a nursemaid in the Tuileries Garden in Paris. Another theory suggests that Jeanne Duval, who was in a relationship with Manet's friend Charles Baudelaire, introduced Manet and Laure. This theory was discussed by Pollock, as well as by Manet archivist Achille Tabarant.

Manet's notebook, included in the 2019 exhibition Le Modèle noir, de Géricault à Matisse at the musee d'Orsay in Paris, recorded her address at 11, rue de Vintimille in Paris.
This was less than a ten-minute walk from Manet's apartment, in a neighborhood inhabited by avant-garde artists and writers, as well as a "small but highly visible" black population. This residence was close to Duval, who Baudelaire wrote to at 17 rue Sauffroy.

Art modeling

Laure also appeared in Manet's painting Children in the Tuileries Garden (1861-62). In both Olympia and Children in the Tuileries Garden paintings she is wearing the same outfit of a pink dress with a high white collar and a madras headtie. It is not known whether she was ever painted by other artists during that period. 

In 1862-63, Manet painted a portrait of Laure, La Négresse, which is also known as Portrait of Laure. this painting's subtitle is "une très belle négresse."

Discussion in Art History 
Laure has not been widely studied in art history. With a few exceptions, she is presented as "ancillary" or as a part of a larger colonial theme within the painting.

Legacy 
Manet's depictions of Laure are referenced in later works. Artists including Frédéric Bazille, Henri Matisse, and Romare Bearden quoted and referenced the Laure figure. Some artists reference Laure specifically, while others merge Laure and Olympia into one character. Laure is a figure portrayed by many black artists who bring her to the forefront as "a subject in her own right, deserving of subjectivity."

Contemporary depictions 
Renee Cox frequently references Laure in her works, combining or switching her and Olympia. Her works that reference Laure and Olympia include the 2001 Olympia's Boyz, which combines the characters, and the 2008 Missy at Home, which art historian Tracey Walters views as a reversal of the Olympia and Laure roles. 

Maud Sulter has depicted Laure in many of her works, including her 1989 Phalia (Portrait of Alice Walker) and her 2002 Portrait d’une négresse (Bonny Greer) and Jeanne Duval: A Melodrama. In Jeanne Duval: A Melodrama, Sulter overlay Laure in Olympia with  an 1850s Nadar photograph of an unknown black model, who Sulter suggested might be Duval.

Mickalene Thomas frequently references Laure in her work. Her 2012 series Une très belle négresse, which takes its name from the Portrait of Laure subtitle.

Elizabeth Colomba's 2018 painting Laure (Portrait of a Negresse) depicts Laure on her way to Manet's studio. Colomba's painting was included in the exhibition Posing Modernity: The Black Model from Manet and Matisse to Today, alongside Manet's paintings of Laure, at the Wallach Art Gallery, Columbia University. This exhibit, curated by Denisse Murrell, placed Laure in the spotlight, which redefined and named black women in art.

Gallery

See also 

 Fanny Eaton 
 Joseph (art model)
 Seïd Enkess
 Madeleine (art model)

References

French artists' models 
Édouard Manet
19th-century French women
African diaspora in France